Sohawa is an administrative sub-division (Tehsil) of the Jhelum District, situated in the Punjab province of Pakistan, located in the northwestern part of the district. One sign of Sohawa is the toll plaza by the name of 'Tarakki' on the Grand Trunk Road. The main bazaar of Sohawa attracts people from nearby villages.

Union Councils 
Sohawa Tehsil is subdivided into 9 Union Councils: Adrana, Domeli, Jajial, Kohali, Lehri, Nagial, Pail Bane Khan, Phulrey Sydan, Pind Matay Khan and Sohawa.

History 

The Etymology of the name Sohawa has not been proven, yet, according to folk etymologies, the original name was Soo Awa which means '100 fences of potters'. Originally a small village near Khoraka, Soahwa merged with Khoraka after several years of human settlement. The original village is part of the main town (Khoraka) and is called "Ward #1" or Purana Sohawa (literally "old Sohawa").

Demographics 

The most famous village is Kot Dhamiak (Fort of Dhamials), which has existed since the time of Sultan Raja Dhami Khan. It was a fort at the time when Shahab Din conquered this area in the 16th century, as well as being the place where Shehab-ud-din Ghori was murdered by Khokhars. The village named Bishindaur which was changed to Dewan-e-Hazoori by Mian Mohammad Nawaz Shareef at the request of Chairman Majlis-e-Qadria Dewan-e-Hazoori Sahibzada Pir Syed Dildar Ali Shah (Custodian of the Shrine of Dewan-e-Hazoori) is located about 5 miles from Sohawa. Bishandour was named after Bishan Singh who ruled the area and was the grandson of Raja Ram Singh who was the ruler of Amber, and head of the Kachwaha Rajput clan, from 1688 to 1699. Bishandour village is named after the great saint Dewan-e-Hazoori. Today, a big market in the village is where most of the community do their shopping.

Dewan e Hazoori was the biggest food market of Sohawa before partition. Dewan e Hazoori has an annual religious event for the birth of the Wali Haji Hafiz Syed Muhammed Abdullah, commonly known as Dewan E Hazoori. There are a darbar and a mosque at the heart of the village, where people flock to every Thursday to visit and pay their respects. Dewan-e-Hazoori Educational Complex is also a place to visit in Dewan-e-Hazoori. Surgdhan Village is also a famous place of Sohawa Tehsil.
According to the 2017 census of Pakistan, the most widely spoken first languages are Punjabi (98%), Urdu (1.9%) and Pashto (0.1%). Urdu is spoken and understood by most of the population.
According to the 2017 census of Pakistan, the most followed religion in Sohawa Tehsil is Islam followed by 98% of population. 2% is followed by other non-Muslim minorities.

Health facilities 

The Tehsil Headquarters Hospital (THQs) Sohawa for the people of Sohawa and surrounding rural areas has been developed by the Government of Pakistan that provides only basic health facilities. The hospital currently houses 40 beds, 20 for female and 20 for male patients. The following facilities are available: emergency services, 4 bedded labour room services, operation theatre facilities, dental surgery, ambulance services, indoor services lab, X-Rays, ultrasonography facilities, ECG facilities, blood bank, 24 hours round the clock & OPD curative, and preventive and rehabilitative services.  The following Posts of Specialists are still vacant: Medical Specialist, Child Specialist, gynaecologist, ophthalmologist, ENT specialist, pathologist, and radiologist. This hospital offers free facilities for MCH and deliveries. Presently there are three female doctors to provide round the clock 24-hour care. There is also a rural health center in Domeli, which includes 12 basic health units (Adrana, Jandala, Nagial, Gurah Uttam Singh, Kohali, Phulray Syedan, Surgdhan, Dewan e Hazoori, Pail Mirza, Karounta, Panchor, and Banth), three Government rural dispensaries (Lehri, Gaddar, and Baragawah), and four Rural dispensaries (dial, Hayal, Pari derwaiza & Dhairy bakrala) to provide additional health services.

Major tribes and clans 

The major tribes and clans of the district are the following:

 Gakhars or Kayani – Sikandaraal, Bhogial, and other sub houses. Descendants of sultans who ruled the Potohar region from the borders of Gujarat to the south and Kashmir to the north in alliance with the Mughal Emperors. They were overcome during the Sikh invasion of Punjab where the Sikhs were better equipped and in a much larger force. Presently, most use the title 'Raja', to denote a genteel 'Sahu' lifestyle and was a trend brought about-possibly a generalisation method used under British rule. Malak (Garrison head) would be closer to the original title for most males of this tribe, while Sultan would be reserved for the tribal head.
 Rajputs – Akra, Bangial, Bhatti, Chauhan, Dhammial, Janjua, Manhas and Panwars
 Awan – Budhal
 Chaudhary (Jats) – Dhillon, Nagial, Bangial (mostly belong to minorities), Hariar, Jandrial, Kamawal, Warraich, Kalyals, Kanyals, Khatarmal, Khattar, Makwal, Mathyals, Soomro, Tarar
 Kashmiri
 Mughals
 Sayyid (Bukhari, Kazmi)
 Sheikhs
 Khokhars
Many of the tribes listed above are presented in the British India Census of 1881, as both Raja and Jat clans. Hence the population is divided into both clans. Generally the 'als' are branches of Rajput clans.

Raja title

An individual in Potohar region "...does not look on himself as a Rajput first and then as a Gakhar or a Janjua or an Awan, but as a member of one of these tribes first, and then as Sahu or as Rajput, which entitles him to a certain social position".

From the 18th to the 20th centuries, 'Sahu' term became synonymous with those families from aristocratic backgrounds and meant a "...gentle lifestyle of hawks, horses and servants".

It seems, two broad categorisations were used by the local populace to distinguish between 'Sahu' and 'non-Sahu' families, as "...the chief tribes, such as the Gakkars, Janjuas, Awans, etc., are "Sahu", though not necessarily all Rajputs. The "Sahu" will, however commonly call himself Rajput, whilst the zamindar is called Jat."

References

Footnotes

Notes 

 https://web.archive.org/web/20120209043508/http://www.nrb.gov.pk/lg_election/union.asp?district=12&dn=Jhelum
 http://harrysworldatlas.blogspot.com/2008/03/pakistan-pk-punjab-province-rawalpindi.html

External links 
 Government of Punjab

Sohawa Tehsil
Tehsils of Jhelum District
Jhelum District
Tehsils of Punjab, Pakistan